Tropidonophis dolasii is a species of snake in the family Colubridae. The species is endemic to Papua New Guinea.

Etymology
The specific name, dolasii, is in honor of Papua New Guinean, Dolasi Salepuna, for his field assistance.

Habitat

Diet
T. dolasii preys upon frogs.

Reproduction
T. dolasii is oviparous.

References

Further reading
Kraus F, Allison A (2004). "A new species of Tropidonophis (Serpentes: Colubridae: Natricinae) from the D'Entrecasteaux Islands, Papua New Guinea". Proceedings of the Biological Society of Washington 117 (3): 303–310. (Tropidonophis dolasii, new species).

Tropidonophis
Reptiles of Papua New Guinea
Reptiles described in 2004